Freymóður Jóhannsson (September 12, 1895 - March 3, 1973) was an Icelandic artist, painter and song composer.

1895 births
1973 deaths
Icelandic artists
20th-century Icelandic artists